Jules Solime Milscent (1778 – 7 May 1842) was a Haitian fabulist, poet, and politician. He was a mulatto, born in Grande-Rivière du Nord to a white French father and a free black mother. Educated in France, Milscent co-founded the periodical L'Abeille Haytienne and served in several government positions, including a seat on the commission to draft the Haitian Civil Code. He is best known for his fables, such as:
L'Homme, la Guêpe et le Serpent
Le Cœur et l'Esprit
L'Homme et le Serpent
Le Chien et le Loup
L'Enfant et la Sauterelle

Milscent was killed in the 1842 Cap-Haïtien earthquake.

References

 

1778 births
1842 deaths
Fabulists
Haitian people of French descent
Haitian people of Mulatto descent
Haitian male poets
Haitian politicians
Deaths in earthquakes
Natural disaster deaths in Haiti
19th-century Haitian poets
19th-century male writers